Clear Horizon – The Best of Basia is a greatest hits compilation album by Polish-born singer Basia, released in November 1998 by Sony Music Entertainment.

Overview
The album consists of 17 songs, four of which were originally released on Basia's debut album, Time and Tide (1987), two from London Warsaw New York (1990), five from The Sweetest Illusion (1994), and two from the live album Basia on Broadway (1995). The remaining four songs were original recordings made exclusively for this compilation, although "Angels Blush" had been released as a standalone single back in 1995. The cover photograph was taken by Simon Fowler.

The compilation was first released on 11 November 1998 in Japan, with the worldwide premiere following on 18 November. The title song was released as the lead single and reached no. 31 on Tokio Hot 100 chart on Japanese radio station J-Wave in December 1998. "Go for You" followed as a radio single in Poland in 1999. The compilation was titled Clear Horizon – The Best Of... in some territories, and was Basia's final release for Sony. The album was not a commercial success due to lack of promotion from the label.

Track listing

Charts

References

External links
 The official Basia website
 Clear Horizon – The Best of Basia on Discogs

1998 compilation albums
Basia compilation albums
Epic Records compilation albums